Vata may refer to:

People
Vata (noble), 11th-century Hungarian chieftain
Vata, Bishop of Várad, 12th-century Hungarian prelate
Vata Matanu Garcia, former Angolan football striker
Fatmir Vata (born 1971), Albanian footballer
Rudi Vata (born 1969), Albanian footballer and manager

Places
Vata, Central African Republic
Vața, a village in Vedea Commune, Argeș County, Romania
Vața de Jos, a commune in Hunedoara County, Romania, and its village of Vața de Sus

In religion
Vāta, another name for Vāyu, Hindu deity, lord of the winds, father of Bhima
A particular Zoroastrian divinity, one half of the pair Vata-Vayu

Other uses
Vata (beetle), a genus of ground beetles in the family Carabidae
Vata pagan uprising, a Hungarian rebellion in 1046
A dialect of the Dida language spoken in Ivory Coast
One of the three elemental substances, or doshas, of the Ayurveda discipline of traditional medicine